Progression, previously stylized as PROGRESSION, was a music creation and performance computer program created by NOTION Music (now owned by PreSonus). Created for use on Microsoft Windows and macOS laptops or desktops, Progression focused on composition for guitar, but could also be used to compose for keyboards (piano, electric piano, and clavinet), bass (electric and upright), and drums (standard drum set). As of April 2019, Progression is no longer available for sale in the PreSonus online store, nor via dealers worldwide.

Summary
Users could compose in Progression both in standard notation and tablature ("tab") at the same time and hear their musical ideas played back with digital samples from Victor Wooten (bass), Roy "Futureman" Wooten (drums), Neil Zaza (guitar), and others.

Playback features included built-in effects and amp simulators, customizable bends and slides, and continuous real-time control of playback tempos. With its MIDI Out features, users could incorporate sounds from other sound libraries outside of Progression.

Input
Users could enter notes, rests, and chords with standard computer keyboard/mouse input (including keyboard shortcuts) or by MIDI keyboard, MIDI guitar, MusicXML file, MIDI file, or any mix of these. Other input options included an interactive fretboard (that a user can add/remove strings and assign alternate tunings) and chord library. Changes made to the tab staff automatically updated an instrument's standard notation staff and vice versa.

Output
The program's audio mixer included gain, pan, and mute/solo buttons for individual instruments, and also provided access to effects and digital channels for routing audio to a mixing board or digital audio workstation.

In addition to Progression files, output options included print-out, wav digital audio file, standard MIDI file, or MusicXML file.

Notes

See also
 PreSonus
 Notion (software)
 List of music software

External links
 

Scorewriters